Alfonso Petersen Farah (born 2 February 1961) is a Mexican physician and politician who served as municipal president of Guadalajara, Jalisco, from 2007 to 2009.

Petersen studied medicine at the LaSalle University and the National Autonomous University of Mexico (UNAM). He served as Jalisco's state health secretary. In July 2006, he was elected municipal president of Guadalajara, representing the National Action Party (PAN), and assumed office on 31 December 2006.

In October 2009, during the 2009 flu pandemic, Petersen resigned from his post as substituted Alfonso Gutiérrez Carranza as Jalisco's secretary of public health.

See also 
 2006, Jalisco state election

References 

National Autonomous University of Mexico alumni
1961 births
Politicians from Guadalajara, Jalisco
Living people
Municipal presidents of Guadalajara, Jalisco
21st-century Mexican politicians